Austin Ventures (AV) is a private equity firm focused on venture capital and growth equity investments in business services and supply chain, financial services, new media, Internet, and information services companies nationally with a focus on Texas. The firm, which is based in Austin, Texas, was founded in 1984.  AV has raised approximately $3.9 billion since inception across ten private equity funds.

In September 2008, the firm announced the closing of Austin Ventures X with $900 million of investor commitments, which will be used to fund start-up capital for emerging companies and growth capital for expansion rounds and recapitalizations.

In 2003, Austin Ventures, had offered to buy Hoover's Inc. for about $131 million in cash. Which was later withdrawn after a week as per Hoover's.

See also

 Silicon Hills

References

In the news 

MARATHON AND AUSTIN WITHDRAW BID FOR HOOVER'S.  The New York Times, February 14, 2003
Austin Ventures to buy financial publication publisher.  Austin Business Journal, December 22, 2008
Number of US venture capital funds raising capital significantly down in Q3.  AltAssets, October 14, 2008

External links 
Austin Ventures (company website)

Venture capital firms of the United States
Financial services companies established in 1979
Private equity firms of the United States
Companies based in Austin, Texas
1979 establishments in Texas